Aurelio Suárez (14 January 1910 Gijón – 10 April 2003 Gijón) was a Spanish painter. He developed an extensive body of work using various styles of painting.

Biography 

Suárez was born in Gijón, where he held his first exhibition when he was 19 years old at the Escuela Superior de Comercio. He mixed his surrealistic imagination with images of his life: the city, people and self-portraits. He also worked for magazines drawing comics strips or even designing for dishes and ceramics. 
In 1934, he had an exhibition in the Modern Art Museum of Madrid (currently Museo Reina Sofía).

Further reading 

 "Escritores y artistas asturianos", Constantino Suárez. Ed. IDEA 1959
 "Historia de las Artes Plásticas Asturianas", Jesus Villa Pastur. Ayalga Ediciones 1977.
 "El surrealismo en la posguerra de España Museo de Teruel", VV. AA. Ciudad de ceniza. Museo de Teruel 1992.
 Exhibition at ARCO

External links 
 Asturias Museum of Beaux Arts
 Casa Natal of Jovellanos Museum (Gijón)
 Posthumous Catalogue of the exhibition at Guillermo de Osma Gallery with several images.

1910 births
2003 deaths
People from Gijón
Modern painters
20th-century Spanish painters
20th-century Spanish male artists
Spanish male painters
Painters from Asturias